Vivian Park is an unincorporated community in northeastern Utah County, Utah, United States.

Description

It is situated between Mount Timpanogos on the northwest, Wildwood on the east, Cascade Mountain on the south, and Bridal Veil Falls on the west. The community was named after Vivian McBride (daughter of the owner of the first grocery store and post office on the Provo East Bench).

When the late Thomas S. Monson (former President of the LDS Church) was a child he would spend summers from the 4th of July to Labor Day at Vivian Park. He owned the family cabin there until he died.

The Vivian Park station is the western terminus of the Heber Valley Railroad. (The heritage railroad runs east to its main station, and eastern terminus, in Heber City in the Heber Valley.)

Geography
Vivian Park is located at  (40.35496, -111.574083).

Demographics
Residents of Vivian Park are officially known as "Vivianites".

See also

References

External links

Unincorporated communities in Utah
Unincorporated communities in Utah County, Utah
Provo–Orem metropolitan area